This is a list of male and female British bodybuilders. British can be either citizens of the United Kingdom, islands of British Crown Dependencies, or of one of the British overseas territories can be classed as British.

A

B 
Albert Beckles
Brian Bell
Andrulla Blanchette
Sam Bond
Sarah Bridges
Carl Broomfield

C 
Rene Campbell
Geoff Capes
Carolyn Cheshire
Sean Connery

D
Rob Dixon

E
Gregor Edmunds
Eddy Ellwood

F
Mark Felix
Bertil Fox

G
Mick Gosling
Richard Gosling
Angus Graham

H
Terry Hollands
Tony Hollands

I
Brian Irwin

J

K
Carmen Knights

L
John Lees
Marc Iliffe

M
Karen Marillier
Jimmy Marku
Wendy McCready
Gayle Moher
Graham Mullins
Stuart Murray
neil mcphail

N
Jamo Nezzar

O

P
Reg Park
David Prowse
Lee Powell

R
Andrew Raynes
Jamie Reeves
Adrian Rollinson
Glenn Ross
Rob Riches

S
Nicola Shaw
Mark Smith
Ramsford Smith
Emma Sue
Dawn Sutherland

T
Gary Taylor
Oli Thompson
Dave Titterton
Mike Thurston
Grant Thomas

V

W
David Warner

Y
Dorian Yates

Z

Zakos Pallikaros

See also
 List of female professional bodybuilders
 List of male professional bodybuilders
 List of German bodybuilders

References

External links 
 WSM Website

Professional bodybuilding
Bodybuilding
Lists of bodybuilders
 List